Leandro Gastón Paiva Santurión (born 15 February 1994) is a Uruguayan professional footballer who plays as an attacking midfielder for Argentinos Juniors.

Career
Paiva's had youth stints with Club Cohami and Montevideo Wanderers. He made his professional bow in the Uruguayan Primera División on 11 May 2013, featuring for the final moments of a home victory over Liverpool; he had previously been an unused substitute earlier that month against Racing Club. In total, he made thirty appearances across four seasons with Montevideo Wanderers. February 2016 saw Oriental of the Uruguayan Segunda División sign Paiva. He netted his first senior goal in his final match on 11 June versus Huracán. A move to Deportivo Maldonado was completed in July. Four goals in thirty-one followed.

On 8 January 2018, Paiva joined top-flight outfit Cerro. His stint with the club lasted twelve months, with the midfielder participating in thirty-six fixtures in all competitions whilst scoring nine goals; including a brace in the Primera División over Progreso and one in a Copa Sudamericana second stage encounter against Bahia. At the conclusion of the year, in December, Paiva departed Uruguayan football to play in Argentina with Argentinos Juniors. He scored on his debut, netting in a Copa Argentina win over Douglas Haig on 5 March 2019. A total of eight games came for him within his first nine months with the Buenos Aires team.

Paiva left Argentinos on loan in September to Ascenso MX's Atlante.

Career statistics
.

References

External links

1994 births
Living people
Footballers from Montevideo
Uruguayan footballers
Association football midfielders
Uruguayan expatriate footballers
Uruguayan Primera División players
Uruguayan Segunda División players
Argentine Primera División players
Montevideo Wanderers F.C. players
Oriental players
Deportivo Maldonado players
C.A. Cerro players
Argentinos Juniors footballers
Atlante F.C. footballers
Expatriate footballers in Argentina
Expatriate footballers in Mexico
Uruguayan expatriate sportspeople in Argentina
Uruguayan expatriate sportspeople in Mexico